Cyril Simpson (18 August 1942 – January 2015) was an English professional association footballer of the 1950s. He played as a forward in the Football League for Gillingham, making 18 appearances. Simpson was born in August 1942 in Aylesham, Kent, and died in Kent in January 2015 at the age of 72.

References

1942 births
2015 deaths
People from Aylesham
English footballers
Association football forwards
Gillingham F.C. players
English Football League players